Trochoidea liebetruti  is a species of air-breathing land snail, a terrestrial pulmonate gastropod mollusk in the family Geomitridae, the hairy snails and their allies.

Distribution

This species is endemic to Cyprus.

References

 Bank, R. A.; Neubert, E. (2017). Checklist of the land and freshwater Gastropoda of Europe. Last update: July 16th, 2017

External links
 Albers, J. C. (1852). Neue Heliceen. Zeitschrift für Malakozoologie. 9(12): 186-189

Trochoidea (genus)
Invertebrates of Cyprus
Endemic fauna of Cyprus
Gastropods described in 1852